Anthene aequatorialis is a butterfly in the family Lycaenidae. It is found in Tshuapa in the Democratic Republic of the Congo.

References

Butterflies described in 1962
Anthene
Endemic fauna of the Democratic Republic of the Congo
Butterflies of Africa